The Kia Ceed (known as the Kia cee'd before 2018) is a compact car produced by the South Korean manufacturer Kia since 2006 exclusively for the European market. The Ceed was first unveiled on 28 September 2006 at the Paris Motor Show. In mid-2007, the station wagon version called the cee'd_sw was launched followed by the three-door pro_cee'd in early 2008. The second generation of the cee'd was presented at the 2012 Geneva Motor Show. At the 2018 Geneva Motor Show, Kia presented the third generation Ceed. In September 2019, Kia also unveiled the XCeed, a crossover SUV based on the third generation Ceed.

It is the first Kia vehicle to be designed entirely in Europe and tailored to European customers. To mark the occasion, Kia took the initials of the European Economic Community, EEC or CEE in several languages and added ED for European Design. Realizing that "CEEED" had too many ‘E's, they replaced the last 'E' with an apostrophe, with 'Cee'd' being the end result. Since 2018, the Ceed name does not include an apostrophe. The initials now mean "Community of Europe, with European Design". The model has been manufactured at the Kia Motors Slovakia assembly plant in Žilina since October 2006. The Ceed replaced the Cerato which had little success in Europe, and is positioned between the Rio supermini (B-segment) and the Optima mid-size car (D-segment).



First generation (ED; 2006)

The Cee'd was designed in Frankfurt, Germany, with Miklós Kovács leading the design team, while the concept car was designed by Pontus Fontaeus. The cee'd is developed on the same platform as the Hyundai i30. The first generation was available with a choice of four engines (two petrol and two diesel), five trim levels and either manual or automatic transmission.

There were three trim levels available: LX, EX, TX. The flagship TX trim was equipped with semi leather seats, Michelin 225/45 tires with 17 inch alloy wheels and rear parking sensors. All versions have six airbags as standard, active front headrests, height-adjustable headrests, pretensioners, ESP, electronic traction control, ABS, EBD, BA, and a reinforced structure of the cabin. Upon release on the market, the warranty is one of the most extensive and longest in Europe with seven years or 150,000 km for the powertrain and five years for the entire vehicle.

In September 2009, the facelifted model was unveiled at the 63rd Frankfurt Motor Show. While the five-door and the station wagon were given an updated front and rear design, including the Kia's new corporate grille called the Tiger Nose, technical revisions and minor changes in the interior, the three-door version exterior was not updated.

Approximately 646,300 units of the first-generation Cee'd were produced.

Body styles 
Kia Pro_cee'd

The Pro_cee'd is the sports version of the Kia Cee'd, with a 3-door body and a new rear-end design. The concept car was showcased for first time at the Paris Motor Show in 2006. Apart from the 3-door hatchback body, the car is given a lower stance compared to the original 5-door Cee'd as it is 5 cm lower and 5 cm longer. The official pictures of the production version were released in July 2007.

Kia Cee'd Sportswagon

The Cee'd Sportswagon is the station wagon of the Cee'd. It is the only version that features the 2.0-litre CRDi engine. The claimed boot space is 534 dm³ with the rear seats unfolded and 1664 dm³ with the seats folded down.

Pre-facelift

Facelift

Safety

The Kia Cee'd earned a Euro NCAP 5 star safety rating for adult occupants for the pre 2009 model. It is also fitted with six airbags (including curtain airbags) as standard even in countries like Ukraine where safety options were usually stripped in comparison with other countries.

 Adult Occupants  score – 34
 Child Occupants  score – 37
 Pedestrians  score – 11

The Euro NCAP results also showed that the dashboard can become a threat to the driver and passenger's knees in the event of a front collision, despite having 6 airbags in the car and the Cee'd also scored the maximum available points for the side impact and pole tests.

Second generation (JD; 2012)

Making its worldwide premiere at the 2012 Geneva Motor Show is the all-new second-generation Cee'd (with internal code JD) which is claimed to be more sophisticated, efficient, refined, better equipped with a more engaging driving experience than the first generation. The second-generation Cee'd is, however, significantly more expensive than the first generation and moves the Cee'd out of the "budget" market as noted by independent reviewers such as Honest John. With the new Cee'd, came Kia's first attempt of a hot hatch with the Pro Cee'd GT.

First shown in June 2015, a facelifted model of the Cee'd went on sale in September of the same year.

Approximately 647,700 units of the second-generation Cee'd were produced.

Pre-facelift

Facelift

Pro_Cee'd GT and Cee'd GT

Kia released the Pro_Cee'd GT in July 2013, while the 5-door Cee'd GT was released January 2014. The Pro_Cee'd GT is the company's first performance oriented car and the first European style "hot hatch" from a Korean manufacturer. It would act as a halo model for the rest of the range. It is also the first Kia sold in the UK with a turbo-charged petrol engine.

The Pro_Cee'd GT uses a variant of the T-GDi Gamma engine. The engine in the Pro_Cee'd GT is the same as that used in the American market Hyundai Veloster Turbo, but different gear ratios and more aggressive suspension have been used. The engine propels the car from 0-60 mph (97 km/h) in 7.4 seconds, 0.4 seconds faster than the Veloster Turbo with the same engine (albeit a with a lower tune). The suspension in the GT has been modified over the standard Pro_Cee'd, giving a far more agile and sporting ride.

A body kit has been fitted to give the car a more muscular stance. The rear bumper now includes a splitter and twin exhausts, whilst the front introduces a large air intake with red pinstripe, a gloss black grille with silver GT badge and distinctive LED "Ice Cube" daytime running lights—side skirts are also fitted. The car runs on 18" Alloy Wheels over the standard car's 17" wheels. The interior gains red accents including an overstitched GT badge on the bottom of the steering wheel, as well as Leather and Suede Recaro sports racing bucket seats and TFT instrument dial, allowing the driver to switch between an analogue speedometer and digital readout with boost pressure and torque meters.

Third generation (CD; 2018)

The third-generation Ceed was announced in February 2018 and revealed ahead of the 2018 Geneva Motor Show. The estate version was announced in March and officially revealed at the 2018 Geneva Motor Show. The production of the hatchback started in May 2018 and the car became available in June. The production of the estate version started in summer 2018.

Pre-facelift

Facelift

Proceed

XCeed

Engines

Sales
The Cee'd became Kia's best selling European model from 2007 to 2011, strongly outperforming sales of its predecessor, the Cerato—and the previous best selling model, the Picanto—with sales of between 90,000 and 150,000 units per year. In 2008, the cee'd represented 44% of Kia's total sales volumes in Europe. Sales benefited from the innovative seven years' warranty—the first such warranty ever to be offered on any vehicle marketed in Europe.

Concepts

Kia Pro_cee'd
At the 2007 Frankfurt Motor Show, Kia unveiled the Pro_Cee'd, The Show Car designed by Pontus Fontaeus, and began marketing the model in January 2008. The Pro_Cee'd is mechanically identical to the 5-door model but many body panels (sans the bonnet and front-wings) are new and do not carry over from the 5-door model. The first-generation Pro_Cee'd was often compared to the Audi A3 in terms of its appearance, Auto Express calling it a "bargain Audi A3".

In 2013, Kia released the second-generation Pro_Cee'd. Unlike the previous generation, this car shares no body panels with the 5-door model. The new Pro_Cee'd has been continually praised in reviews for its looks, with a more coupé-like appearance, more sporting stance, lower suspension (by 40 mm) and a smaller front grille. The car has, however, gained some criticism; it excels at comfort and refinement like the standard Cee'd, but its suspension and steering are not considered at all sporty, its setup favouring the aforementioned comfort.

In 2017, Kia released a concept for the third-generation ProCeed. This time as a shooting brake version of the Ceed.

Kia Ex_cee'd

Kia's Ex_cee'd cabriolet concept car premiered at the 77th Geneva International Motor Show in 2007 and was designed by Pontus Fontaeus. Based on the three-door Cee'd hatchback (Pro_cee'd), the Ex_cee'd shares the same platform, but features different exterior panels and an electric folding fabric roof.

Kia Eco_cee'd
Kia revealed a concept of its Pro_cee'd line, with improved aerodynamics and mild hybrid engine tuning to their diesel engine, under the name "Eco_cee'd". The concept models were fitted with ISG (Idle Stop&Go) and regenerative braking.

Hybrid version

In popular culture
On 27 June 2010, the Kia Cee'd was revealed as the new reasonably priced car for the "Star in a Reasonably-Priced Car" segment of the top-rated UK television programme Top Gear, where presenter Jeremy Clarkson incorrectly and persistently pronounces the name as "Cee-apostrophe-d" and describes it as "the only car with an apostrophe in its name." The car was eventually replaced in Series 20 by a Vauxhall Astra. Top Gear dented several Cee'ds in a game of car rugby in 2013.

Motorsport
The Kia Cee'd has been homologated for TCR-specification series and is manufactured and supplied by Austrian company STARD. Kia will run a factory-supported team in the Scandinavian Touring Car Championship in 2017.

The Pro Cee'd serves as an official safety car in Poland's Kia Lotos Race, a racing organization created by Kia Motors Polska and Grupa Lotos.

Outside Europe

The Cee'd was being initially available only in the markets of Europe, Israel and South Africa.

In Russia and Kazakhstan, the first two generations of Cee'd were sold alongside the Kia Forte.

Kia began selling Cee'd models in Morocco since 2010. As of 2020, Kia still sells Cee'd models in Morocco, alongside the Kia Cerato.

In 2014, the Pro_Cee'd GT was being sold in Israel, Australia and New Zealand. In 2015, Kia Australia announced that the Pro_Cee'd GT would no longer be offered in 2016, registering just 746 units over the two years on sale.

Reception 
Auto Express – New Car Honours – Special Honour for seven-year warranty
Autocar – 'Idea of the Year' for Cee'd seven-year warranty
What Diesel Car? – Hatchback of the year
Towcar awards 2007
Camping Fritid (Danish Camping magazine, from DCU) – Camping car of the year 2007
 UK survey, Cee'd ranked in first place in the Driver Power's Compact Family category to beat out Volkswagen, Toyota, Fiat and other notable competitors in the segment. Driver Power is Auto Express's car owner reliability and satisfaction survey which presents the frank and honest views of drivers in the UK.
 Top Gear named it runner up in their car of the year award for 2009 (broadcast 3 January 2010). They then named it as their new "reasonably priced car" from series 15 to series 20.
 German auto magazine ACE Lenkrad, Kia Cee'd surpassed the Toyota Auris and the Volkswagen Golf.
 German auto magazine Autobild, Cee'd was rated higher than the Toyota Auris, Citroen C4 and Honda Civic.
 Austrian auto magazine Autotouring (2007.4); Cee'd was rated above Toyota Auris, Volkswagen Golf, Mazda 3.
 Danish auto magazine Motor, Kia Cee'd is the first car to ever earn the 6-out-of-6 rating.
 Swedish magazine Vi Bilägare found in the yearly long-distance test (one year, 40 000 km; 25,000 miles) that Kia Cee´d had the highest second-hand value among all cars the magazine had tested through the years.
 German car magazine Autobild tested the Kia Cee'd during 100,000 km (60,000 miles). Just a few flaws, ranked as high.
 France's motoring publication L'Automobile Magazine, The Kia Cee'd won a 2009 quality/reliability survey in the compact-car category.

References

External links

 (UK, Ceed)
 (UK, ProCeed)
 (UK, Xceed)

2010s cars
Cars introduced in 2006
Compact cars
Euro NCAP small family cars
Front-wheel-drive vehicles
Hatchbacks
Hybrid electric cars
Cee'd
Station wagons